Wan Shiu Ming (born 1938) is a Hong Kong former freestyle swimmer. He competed in two events at the 1956 Summer Olympics.

References

External links
 

1938 births
Living people
Hong Kong male freestyle swimmers
Olympic swimmers of Hong Kong
Swimmers at the 1956 Summer Olympics
Place of birth missing (living people)